Mx (usually pronounced  ,  , or  , and sometimes   or  ) is an English-language neologistic honorific that does not indicate gender. Developed as an alternative to gendered honorifics (such as Mr. and Ms.) in the late 1970s, it is the most common gender-neutral title among non-binary people and people who do not wish to imply a gender in their titles.

Etymology
The word was first proposed in the late 1970s. The x is intended to stand as a wildcard character, and does not necessarily imply a "mixed" gender.

Usage
In 2013, Brighton and Hove City Council in Sussex, England, voted to allow the use of Mx on council forms, and in 2014 the Royal Bank of Scotland included the title as an option for customers. In 2015, recognition spread more broadly across UK institutions, including the Royal Mail, government agencies responsible for documents such as driving licences, most major banks, several other companies, and UK charity Battersea Dogs & Cats Home.

The title is now accepted by the Department for Work and Pensions, HM Revenue and Customs, the National Health Service and many councils, universities, insurance companies and utility retailers in the United Kingdom. The House of Commons of the United Kingdom confirmed in 2015 that it would accept the use of Mx by MPs.

In 2015, Mx was included in a New York Times article about Bluestockings. Its casual usage in the paper was picked up by popular news sites and blogs. The Times standards editor Phil Corbett later responded to the usage of the title. Later the same year, Mx was included in the Oxford English Dictionary. In 2016, Metro Bank became the first bank in the United Kingdom to offer Mx on its forms (though other banks had amended records to Mx on request prior to this). In 2017, banks of the HSBC Group announced the addition of Mx alongside several other gender-neutral titles as options for their customers. HSBC's 30 March announcement coincided with the International Transgender Day of Visibility, celebrated the following day.

In March 2021, Oscar Davies, a non-binary barrister from the United Kingdom, became the first person to use Mx (instead of Mr/Ms) on the board of their chambers.

Although Mx remains uncommon in the United States, in April 2016 it was added to the Merriam-Webster Unabridged Dictionary.

Mixter is sometimes treated as a long form of the title (like Mister is of Mr).

Indian airlines Vistara and AirAsia India, both Tata Group companies, added Mx as a third option for passengers booking flights from June 2022.

See also
 
 Gender neutrality in English
 Latinx

References

Further reading 
 

1970s neologisms
Gender-neutral language
Honorifics
LGBT rights in the United Kingdom
Non-binary gender